Shirju Posht-e Pain (also Romanized as Shīrjū Posht-e Pā’īn; also known as Shīrjū Posht-e Pā’īn Maḩalleh) is a village in Shirju Posht Rural District, Rudboneh District, Lahijan County, Gilan Province, Iran. At the 2006 census, its population was 343, in 96 families.

References 

Populated places in Lahijan County